Gillis Emanuel Grafström (7 June 1893 – 14 April 1938) was a Swedish figure skater. He was born in Stockholm, Sweden. He won three successive Olympic gold medals in Men's Figure Skating (1920, 1924, 1928) as well as an Olympic silver medal in the same event in 1932, and three World Championships (1922, 1924, 1929). He and Eddie Eagan are the only athletes to have won a gold medal at both the Summer and Winter Olympic Games. Grafström has the further distinction of being the only person to have won an individual gold medal in both the Summer (1920) and Winter Olympics (1924, 1928), although Eagan remains the only one to have managed the feat in different disciplines. Grafstrom is one of the few athletes who have competed in both the Summer and Winter Olympic games. He is one of the oldest figure skating Olympic champions.

Biography
In 1914, Grafstrom competed at the last World Championships before the first world war. After the war, Grafström won the Olympic gold medal three successive times (1920, 1924 and 1928) and the silver medal at the 1932 Winter Olympics. He remains the only male figure skater to have won three Olympic gold medals (Sonja Henie and Irina Rodnina are other three-time Olympic Champions), and with his silver medal in 1932, is the most successful figure skater in Olympic history. He competed in and won three World Championships in 1922, 1924, 1929, competing only intermittently between editions of Olympic Games.

At his first Olympics in Antwerp one of his skates broke and he had to go to town to buy a new pair. Unfortunately only curly-toed skates were available. Despite this, he was still able to win. As of the 2022 Olympics, he remains the only male singles skater to win three individual gold medals in figure skating.

At his last Olympics in 1932 in Lake Placid, he collided with a photographer on the ice and still managed to place second. He later coached Norwegian figure skater Sonja Henie.

Grafström was one of the best skaters ever in compulsory figures. He also invented the Grafström-pirouette (on the back outside edge of the blade) and the flying sit spin. He skated very elegantly and was famous for his interpretation of music.

From 1925 to his death he lived in Potsdam, Germany. He trained on the Bornstedter See (Bornstedt Lake) when it was frozen or in Berlin on the artificial ice rink at the Volkspark Friedrichshain. Grafström studied architecture at the Technical University of Berlin (Technische Hochschule Berlin) and worked later as an architect. He collected graphics, paintings and sculptures about skating. This collection was continued by his wife Cecilie Mendelssohn-Bartholdy (1898–1995). Today this collection belongs to the World Figure Skating Museum in Colorado Springs in the United States. Grafström was also a writer and an etcher.

Grafström died in 1938 in Potsdam, Germany, at the age of 44, of blood poisoning.

Today there is a street in Potsdam named after him. In 1976 he was admitted to the World Figure Skating Hall of Fame. Additionally, Grafström won the Svenska Dagbladet Gold Medal in 1929 (Shared with Sven Utterström).

Results

See also 
 List of Olympic medalists in figure skating
 World Figure Skating Championships
 List of Olympians who won medals in the Summer and Winter Games

References

External links 

 

1893 births
1938 deaths
Sportspeople from Stockholm
Swedish male single skaters
Figure skaters at the 1920 Summer Olympics
Figure skaters at the 1924 Winter Olympics
Figure skaters at the 1928 Winter Olympics
Figure skaters at the 1932 Winter Olympics
Olympic figure skaters of Sweden
Olympic gold medalists for Sweden
Olympic silver medalists for Sweden
Olympic medalists in figure skating
World Figure Skating Championships medalists
Medalists at the 1924 Winter Olympics
Medalists at the 1928 Winter Olympics
Medalists at the 1932 Winter Olympics
Medalists at the 1920 Summer Olympics